"Pop a Top" is a country song written and originally recorded by Nat Stuckey in 1966. The first hit version was released by Jim Ed Brown in May 1967 as the third and final single from his album Just Jim. The song was a number 3 Billboard country single for Brown in late 1967. It was later revived by Alan Jackson as the lead-off single from his 1999 album Under the Influence. Jackson's version peaked at number 6 on the United States Billboard Hot Country Singles & Tracks chart, and number 2 on the Canadian RPM Country Tracks chart.

Content 
The narrator, a bar patron, asks the tender to open another bottle of beer for him, and then he'll go. He commences to tell the bartender about his grief because his girl left him, and either he'll hide it with beer, or he'll be at home remembering heɾ.  The sound of a metal "pop-top" can being opened was a novelty, and that is a significant factor in the creating of this song. The metallic click and hiss sound of opening this type of container is featured several times in the song.

Music video
The music video for Jackson's version was directed by Steven Goldmann, and features Cledus T. Judd. The video begins with Cledus singing a parody of "Here in the Real World", which is titled as "Here in the Beer World". He opens the refrigerator door to grab a bottle of beer called "POP A TOP", and suddenly finding himself at a black tie event, while Alan Jackson performs the song onstage. The video switches between shots of Jackson and his band performing, Cledus socializing, and various people transforming into country versions of themselves whenever a glass passes in front of the camera. At the end of the video, Cledus finds himself back in his kitchen, and frantically opens too many beers to "get the magic back."

Chart performance

Jim Ed Brown
"Pop a Top" debuted at number 71 on the U.S. Billboard Hot Country Singles for the week of May 20, 1967.

Alan Jackson
"Pop a Top" debuted at number 49 on the U.S. Billboard Hot Country Singles & Tracks for the week of October 9, 1999.

Year-end charts

Drinking Game
"Pop a Top" is a popular drinking game in the American south. In this game, the song is played as a cue to tell players when to drink. When the lyric "pop a top, again" is sung, the player must then open and drink a beer before then next time the lyric repeats. When played to completion, the player will consume three beers during the course of the song.

References

1967 singles
1999 singles
Jim Ed Brown songs
Alan Jackson songs
Music videos directed by Steven Goldmann
Song recordings produced by Keith Stegall
RCA Victor singles
Arista Nashville singles
Songs written by Nat Stuckey
1967 songs
Song recordings produced by Felton Jarvis
Songs about alcohol